Eumorphus quadriguttatus, commonly known as Four spotted handsome fungus beetle, is a species of handsome fungus beetle found in India, Andaman Islands, Sri Lanka and Korea.

Description
Nominate subspecies has following characteristics. A medium-sized beetle with a length of about 10 to 12 mm. Body black, and moderately shiny. Antenna and legs are black whereas the part of the femur is reddish. Each elytron possess two large, pale yellowish, nearly round or slightly transverse spots. In antennae, the last 3 antenomeres are flat and broad. Apical margin of elytra in male is broadly rounded whereas female with clearly prolonged. The hairy pad of male is only restricted to the median part of the last two or three abdominal sternites. Th subspecies pulchripes has a bright coral-red femora except in the basal half.

Biology
Adult beetles are known to destroy Piper betle plantations.

Subspecies
Four subspecies have been identified.

 Eumorphus quadriguttatus andamanensis Gorham, 1875
 Eumorphus quadriguttatus convexicollis Gerstaecker, 1857
 Eumorphus quadriguttatus pulchripes Gerstaecker, 1857
 Eumorphus quadriguttatus quadriguttatus (Illiger, 1800)

Gallery

References

External links
 Eumorphus quadriguttatus photos

Endomychidae
Insects of Sri Lanka
Insects described in 1800